Earl of Erroll is a title in the Peerage of Scotland. It was created in 1453 for Sir William Hay. The subsidiary titles held by the Earl of Erroll are Lord Hay (created 1449) and Lord Slains (1452), both in the Peerage of Scotland. The Earls of Erroll also hold the hereditary office of Lord High Constable of Scotland. The office was once associated with great power. The Earls of Erroll hold the hereditary title of Chief of Clan Hay.

The Earl of Erroll is one of four peers entitled to appoint a private pursuivant, with the title "Slains Pursuivant of Arms". Earl of Erroll is also the name of a Scottish highland dance, danced today at Highland games around the world.

The family seat is Woodbury House, near Everton, Bedfordshire.

History

The Hay clan descends from Scoto-Norman knight Guillaume de la Haye, who first appears on the records circa 1160.

Gilbert de la Hay (died April 1333), ancestor of the Earls of Erroll, was the older brother of William de la Hay, ancestor of the Earls of Kinnoull. In 1251, William received a charter of two carucates of land from his brother, which was confirmed by King Alexander III.

Regrant of the earldom of Erroll
A regrant was one of the peculiarities in the Scottish law of peerage, that a party might, by a resignation to the Crown, and a charter following upon such resignation, obtain power to nominate the heirs to succeed him in his honours and dignities. Some of the highest of the Scottish peerages are held under such nominations.

Gilbert Hay, 11th Earl of Erroll, on 13 November 1666, obtained a regrant of his honours. This regrant had special power to nominate his heirs. This nomination was made in 1674 with Gilbert appointing his cousin Sir John Hay of Keillour and his heir male, failing which, appointing Sir John Hay of Keillour's heir female, and failing which, appointing certain Hays of Tweeddale. The 11th Earl of Erroll having died in 1674 without issue, Sir John Hay of Keillour became 12th Earl of Erroll. On his death in 1704, his son, Charles became the 13th Earl of Erroll. Charles died unmarried in 1717, when the title devolved on his sister, Mary.

Mary Hay, 14th Countess of Erroll died in 1758 without issue. Mary's sister Margaret had previously died at Rome in 1723, however she had married James Livingston, 5th Earl of Linlithgow, 4th Earl of Callendar, and had issue, and it is from her that the present Earl of Erroll is descended.

This regrant was questioned in the House of Lords in 1797. The then Earl of Lauderdale had questioned George, the 16th Earl of Erroll's right to vote at an election of the peers of Scotland. One of the objections made to the title was that the title of Earl of Erroll was claimed through a nomination. It was decided in 1748 in the case of the earldom of Stair that this power of nomination could not be validly exercised after the Union. The House of Lords, after a full inquiry, decided in favour of the 16th Earl of Erroll's right to the title. That the Earl of Erroll holds the honours of his house undoubtedly and without dispute, is clear from the decision of the House of Lords.

Earls of Erroll (1453)
William Hay, 1st Earl of Erroll (d. c. 1462)
Nicholas Hay, 2nd Earl of Erroll (d. 1470)
William Hay, 3rd Earl of Erroll (d. 1507)
William Hay, 4th Earl of Erroll (d. 1513)
William Hay, 5th Earl of Erroll (d. 1522)
William Hay, 6th Earl of Erroll (c. 1521–1541)
George Hay, 7th Earl of Erroll (d. 1573)
Andrew Hay, 8th Earl of Erroll (d. 1585)
Francis Hay, 9th Earl of Erroll (d. 1631)
William Hay, 10th Earl of Erroll (d. 1636)
Gilbert Hay, 11th Earl of Erroll (d. 1674)
John Hay, 12th Earl of Erroll (d. 1704)
Charles Hay, 13th Earl of Erroll (d. 1717)
Mary Hay, 14th Countess of Erroll (d. 1758)
James Hay, 15th Earl of Erroll (1726–1778)
George Hay, 16th Earl of Erroll (1767–1798)
William Hay, 17th Earl of Erroll (1772–1819)
William George Hay, 18th Earl of Erroll (1801–1846)
William Harry Hay, 19th Earl of Erroll (1823–1891)
Charles Gore Hay, 20th Earl of Erroll (1852–1927)
Victor Alexander Sereld Hay, 21st Earl of Erroll (1876–1928)
Josslyn Victor Hay, 22nd Earl of Erroll (1901–1941)
Diana Denyse Hay, 23rd Countess of Erroll (1926–1978)
Merlin Sereld Victor Gilbert Hay, 24th Earl of Erroll (b. 1948)

The heir apparent is the present holder's son Harry Thomas William Hay, Lord Hay (b. 1984).

See also

Clan Hay
Baron Kilmarnock
Earl of Kinnoull

Footnotes

References

External links

Earldoms in the Peerage of Scotland
 
Clan Hay
1453 establishments in Scotland
Noble titles created in 1453